The Apostolic Vicariate of Casanare was a Roman Catholic apostolic vicariate, located in the central eastern region of Colombia.

History 
 July 17, 1893: Established as Apostolic Vicariate of Casanare from the Diocese of Tunja.
 May 15, 1915: Lost some territory for establishing of Apostolic Prefecture of Arauca.
 October 29, 1999: Suppressed and divided between two newly created ecclesiastical jurisdictions: Vicariate Apostolic of Trinidad (still missionary) and Roman Catholic Diocese of Yopal.

References

External links 
 GCatholic.org

Apostolic vicariates
Roman Catholic dioceses in Colombia
Religious organizations established in 1893
Roman Catholic dioceses and prelatures established in the 19th century
Casanare